Cyclopia intermedia is a species of flowering plant in the legume family. So called honeybush tea is made from fermented leaves and stems of this plant.

References

Herbal tea
South African cuisine
Podalyrieae
Plants used in traditional African medicine